Francis Willis D.D. (a.k.a. Francis Wyllis; died 1597) was an academic administrator at the University of Oxford and Dean of Worcester.

In 1577, Willis was elected President of St John's College, Oxford, a post he held until 1590.
While President at St John's College, he was also Vice-Chancellor of Oxford University from 1587 until 1588. He was also a canon of Bristol Cathedral, of which city he was said to be a native.

Willis was Dean of Worcester from 1586 until his death in 1597.

References

Year of birth missing
1597 deaths
Presidents of St John's College, Oxford
Vice-Chancellors of the University of Oxford
Deans of Worcester